Aurantimonas litoralis is a Gram-negative, catalase- and oxidase-positive, non-motile bacteria from the genus of Aurantimonas which was isolated from coastal water from Oregon in the United States.

References

Hyphomicrobiales
Bacteria described in 2009